Darevskia mixta is a lizard species in the genus Darevskia. It is endemic to Georgia.

References

Darevskia
Reptiles described in 1909
Taxa named by Lajos Méhelÿ